Kathyrn Twyman (born 29 March 1987) is a British and Canadian rower. She was part of the British squad that topped the medal table at the 2011 World Rowing Championships in Bled, where she won a gold medal as part of the lightweight quad sculls with Imogen Walsh, Stephanie Cullen and Andrea Dennis.

References 

1987 births
Living people
English female rowers
Canadian female rowers
World Rowing Championships medalists for Great Britain